Frédéric Fabian William Déhu (born 24 October 1972) is a French former professional footballer who played as a central defender.

Club career
Born in Villeparisis, Seine-et-Marne, Déhu made his professional debut with RC Lens, becoming an undisputed starter from his third season onwards. In 1996–97 he scored a career-best five goals, but the club could only rank 13th; in the following year, he was an essential defensive unit as his team won their first Ligue 1 title.

In summer 1999, after nearly 300 official appearances for Lens, Déhu signed with La Liga giants FC Barcelona, but he played just 23 matches across all competitions for the Louis van Gaal-led side, being released by the Catalans at the end of the campaign and netting his only goal to help defeat AIK Fotboll 5–0 in the group stage of the UEFA Champions League. He then returned to his country and joined Paris Saint-Germain F.C. for about €6 million, remaining four years in the capital and winning the Coupe de France in his final one.

At nearly 32, Déhu moved to Olympique de Marseille and, after two years, he returned to Spain, signing with lowly Levante UD. As in his previous abroad adventure he was sparingly used, also being sent off twice in home matches against Real Madrid (4–1 loss) and Recreativo de Huelva (2–1 win), as the Valencian Community side narrowly avoided top flight relegation.

Amidst accusations of poor organization in the structure of his last club, Déhu retired from the game in March 2008 aged almost 36, after spending the first months of the new campaign without a team.

International career
In two years, Déhu won five caps for the France national team. His debut was on 19 August 1998, in a 2–2 friendly draw to Austria played in Vienna.

Honours
Lens
Division 1: 1997–98
Coupe de la Ligue: 1998–99

Paris Saint-Germain
Coupe de France: 2003–04
UEFA Intertoto Cup: 2001

References

External links
 
 
 Racing Lens archives 
 
 
 
 
 

1972 births
Living people
People from Villeparisis
Footballers from Seine-et-Marne
French footballers
Association football defenders
France international footballers
France under-21 international footballers
Ligue 1 players
RC Lens players
Paris Saint-Germain F.C. players
Olympique de Marseille players
La Liga players
FC Barcelona players
Levante UD footballers
French expatriate footballers
Expatriate footballers in Spain
French expatriate sportspeople in Spain